A by-election was held in the Dáil Éireann Dublin Fingal constituency in Ireland on Friday, 29 November 2019, to fill the vacancy left by the election of Independents 4 Change TD Clare Daly to the European Parliament.

It was held on the same day as three other by-elections in Cork North-Central, Dublin Mid-West and Wexford. The Electoral (Amendment) Act 2011 stipulates that a by-election in Ireland must be held within six months of a vacancy occurring. The by-election writ was moved in the Dáil on 7 November 2019.

At the 2016 general election, the electorate of Dublin Fingal was 93,486, and the constituency elected one Fianna Fáil TD, one Independents 4 Change TD, one Fine Gael TD, one Labour Party TD, and one Sinn Féin TD.

The election was won by Fingal County Councillor Joe O'Brien of the Green Party. It was the first by-election won by a Green Party candidate. Karen Power was co-opted to O'Brien's seat on Fingal County Council following his election to the Dáil

Among the candidates were 2 Senators Lorraine Clifford-Lee and James Reilly and four Fingal County Councillors Ann Graves, Dean Mulligan, Joe O'Brien and  Duncan Smith.

This was the first occasion when by-elections were contested by Independents 4 Change (who also contested Dublin Mid-West) and the Social Democrats (who also contested Cork North-Central and Dublin Mid-West).

Campaign
During the campaign, the Fianna Fáil candidate Lorraine Clifford-Lee was embroiled in controversy when she had to apologise for the language she had used in tweets she had made in 2011, which were derogatory towards the Traveller community.

Result

See also
List of Dáil by-elections
Dáil constituencies

References

External links
Dublin County returning officer

2019 Dublin Fingal by-election
2019 in Irish politics
32nd Dáil
By-elections in the Republic of Ireland
By-elections in County Dublin
November 2019 events in Ireland
Elections in Fingal